Wiliam Dawson Jr. (August 11, 1885 – July 3, 1972) was a career United States diplomat. He was U.S. ambassador to multiple countries, including being the first ambassador to the Organization of American States.

He was born at Saint Paul, Minnesota, on August 11, 1885, the son of William Dawson and Maria Rice. After graduating from the University of Minnesota in 1906, he attended the Ecole Libre des Sciences Politiques in Paris and soon after entered the United States Foreign Service.

His first posting was to St. Petersburg, Russia, in 1908. He served as vice and deputy consul-general to Barcelona, Spain, and Frankfurt, Germany; and consul at Rosario, Argentina; Montevideo, Uruguay; Danzig, Poland; and Munich, Germany.

Dawson was consul-general at large from 1922 to 1924 and served as chief instructor at the Department of State's Foreign Service School from 1925 to 1928. He married Agnes Balloch Bready on June 8, 1926.

He served in Mexico as consul-general; was U.S. Minister to Ecuador, Colombia and Uruguay; and U.S. ambassador to Panama and Uruguay during his long career.

After retiring in 1946 he served as advisor on Latin American affairs to the U.S. delegation during the formation of the United Nations, went to Brazil on a special mission with General George Marshall and became the first U.S. ambassador to the Organization of American States.

He died on July 3, 1972, at the Blue Hill Memorial Hospital, in Blue Hill, Maine. Following a private funeral service he was buried later at Washington, D.C.

References

1885 births
1972 deaths
Ambassadors of the United States to Ecuador
Ambassadors of the United States to Panama
Ambassadors of the United States to Uruguay
American people in the Venona papers
People from Saint Paul, Minnesota
Permanent Representatives of the United States to the Organization of American States
University of Minnesota alumni
Ambassadors of the United States to Colombia
United States Foreign Service personnel
American consuls